Jitu Bhagat alias Jitendrakumar Ramanlal Patel is an Indian politician. He is a Member of the Gujarat Legislative Assembly from the Naranpura Assembly constituency since December 2022. He is associated with the Bharatiya Janata Party.

References 

Gujarat MLAs 2022–2027
Bharatiya Janata Party of Gujarat
Year of birth missing (living people)
Living people